Tony Lavelle Frank (December 9, 1943 – April 18, 2000) was an American actor. He appeared in over 60 film and television roles, notably as Salem Jones in the first two installments of North and South (1985–1986).

Partial filmography

North Dallas Forty (1979) - Rindquist
Liar's Moon (1981) - Dr. Elton Black
Tender Mercies (1983) - Man at Motel
The River Rat (1984) - Poley
Alamo Bay (1985) - Leroy
Sweet Dreams (1985) - Bartender
Extreme Prejudice (1987) - Clarence King
Johnny Be Good (1988) - Joe Bob
Talk Radio (1988) - Dino
Powwow Highway (1989) - Captain Roberts
Riverbend (1989) - Sheriff Jake
UHF (1989) - Teri's Father
Night Game (1989) - Alex Lynch
Born on the Fourth of July (1989) - Mr. Wilson - Georgia
Young Guns II (1990) - Judge Bristol
A Climate for Killing (1991) - Sheriff Elmer Waters
Convicts (1991) - Sheriff
Rush (1991) - Nettle
A Perfect World (1993) - Arch Andrews
Lone Star (1996) - Fenton
Varsity Blues (1999) - Clerk
A Slipping-Down Life (1999) - Zack
On the Borderline (2001) - Kane
Cottonmouth (2002) - Judge Voss (final film role)

External links
 
 

1943 births
2000 deaths
20th-century American male actors
American male film actors
American male television actors
Male actors from Texas
People from Nacogdoches, Texas